Astrophytum capricorne, the goat's horn cactus, is a species of flowering plant in the cactus family Cactaceae, that is native to the Coahuila regions of Northern Mexico.

The common name of goat's horn cactus corresponds to the species identifier capricorne (capri meaning “goat” and corne meaning “horn”)  referring to the curved spines that are said to resemble a goat's horns.

This species is designated as of "least concern" by the IUCN as it is widely distributed in the Chihuahuan desert.

Cultivation
This species is grown, typically from seed, as an ornamental plant as it produces large, attractive yellow flowers with red central regions. Some cultivars bear white flecking on the plant body while others lack this feature. Though tolerant of cold temperatures, it must be grown in a warm, sheltered spot which does not freeze in winter. The soil should be poor, alkaline and very sharply drained. Alternatively it can be grown under glass in a pot with cactus compost. In cultivation in the UK, Astrophytum capricorne has gained the Royal Horticultural Society’s Award of Garden Merit.

Prominent varieties and cultivars include: 
Astrophytum capricorne ‘Crassispinoides‘
Astrophytum capricorne var. crassispinum
Astrophytum capricorne var. minus 
Astrophytum capricorne var. niveum
Astrophytum capricorne var. senile 
Astrophytum capricorne var. aureum

Further reading

References

External links 
 Astrophytum capricorne on Astroweb 
  Astrophytum capricorne  on Astrobase 
 "Star Cactus (Astrophytum capricorne)".  25/2/2007.
  photos on www.AIAPS.org 
 photos on www.cactiguide.com

capricorne
Cacti of Mexico
Endemic flora of Mexico